Morrinhos Futebol Clube, commonly known as Morrinhos, is a Brazilian football club based in Morrinhos, Goiás state.

History
The club was founded on April 20, 1982. They won the Campeonato Goiano Second Level in 2009.

Achievements

 Campeonato Goiano Second Level:
 Winners (1): 2009

Stadium
Morrinhos Futebol Clube play their home games at Estádio do Centro Esportivo João Vilela. The stadium has a maximum capacity of 5,040 people.

References

Association football clubs established in 1982
Football clubs in Goiás
1982 establishments in Brazil